An Dun is an Iron Age broch or dun at the south-east of Loch Ardbhair, Highland, Scotland, UK.

The broch is only approachable at low tide, and at high water there is little space between the edge of the rock and the base of the building. Only one or two of the lowest courses of the outside wall of the building remain visible in places, and the rest is concealed by ruins.

A 1911 survey of the broch reported that "there are no signs of chambers in the walls, nor of galleries, the building is poor, the stones are not carefully selected and laid, and the numerous interstices are packed with small angular fragments". A later, 1980, appraisal notes that "reservations on it being a broch are caused by its small size, and absence of evidence of intra-mural chambers. On balance it is more likely to be a broch."

An Dun was designated a Scheduled Monument on 14 October 1938.

References

Brochs
Scheduled monuments in Scotland
Archaeological sites in Highland (council area)